Joanne "Nana" Fa'avesi (born February 5, 1992) is an American rugby sevens player. She won a silver medal at the 2015 Pan American Games as a member of the United States women's national rugby sevens team.

Fa'avesi was selected to represent the United States at the 2022 Rugby World Cup Sevens in Cape Town.

References

External links 
 

1992 births
Living people
United States international rugby sevens players
Female rugby sevens players
American female rugby sevens players
Rugby sevens players at the 2015 Pan American Games
Pan American Games silver medalists for the United States
Rugby sevens players at the 2016 Summer Olympics
Olympic rugby sevens players of the United States
Sportspeople from California
Pan American Games medalists in rugby sevens
Medalists at the 2015 Pan American Games
People from Salinas, California